The Bride's Silence is a 1917 American silent mystery film directed by Henry King and starring Gail Kane, Lew Cody, and Henry A. Barrows.

Cast
 Gail Kane as Syllvia Standish 
 Lew Cody as Paul Wagner
 Henry A. Barrows as Nathan Standish 
 Jim Farley as Bull Ziegler 
 Robert Klein as Bobbins 
 Ashton Dearholt as Ford

References

Bibliography
 Donald W. McCaffrey & Christopher P. Jacobs. Guide to the Silent Years of American Cinema. Greenwood Publishing, 1999.

External links

1917 films
1917 mystery films
American mystery films
Films directed by Henry King
American silent feature films
1910s English-language films
American black-and-white films
Silent mystery films
1910s American films